Lew Allen Jr. (September 30, 1925 – January 4, 2010) was a United States Air Force four-star general who served as the tenth Chief of Staff of the United States Air Force. As chief of staff, Allen served as the senior uniformed Air Force officer responsible for the organization, training, and equipping of 750,000 active duty Air Force, Air National Guard, Air Force Reserve, and civilian personnel serving in the United States and overseas. As a member of the Joint Chiefs of Staff, he and the other service chiefs function(ed) as the military advisers to the Secretary of Defense, the National Security Council, and the president.

Early life and education
Born in Miami, Florida, Allen attended and graduated from high school in Gainesville, Texas, in 1942. He entered the United States Military Academy, in 1943, and he graduated in 1946 with a Bachelor of Science degree and a commission as a second lieutenant. He was awarded his pilot's wings upon his graduation from flight training.

Military career

After completing multi-engine flight training in November 1946, Allen was assigned to Strategic Air Command's 7th Bombardment Group at Carswell Air Force Base, Texas, where he flew B-29 Superfortress bombers, and then the new and very long-range Convair B-36 bomber. Allen also served in various technical positions in the area of nuclear weapons. Allen also attended the Air Tactical Course at Tyndall Air Force Base, Florida, and next he returned to Carswell Air Force Base as a flight instructor and as an assistant Special Weapons Officer for the 7th Bombardment Wing.

In September 1950, Allen entered the University of Illinois for graduate study in nuclear physics. He completed his Master of Science degree in 1952. Allen continued his graduate study, and he earned his PhD in physics in 1954. He had completed an experimental thesis on high-energy photonuclear reactions. Allen then was assigned to the U.S. Atomic Energy Commission's Los Alamos Scientific Laboratory in Los Alamos, New Mexico, as a physicist in the Test Division, where he became acquainted with the bomb designer Ted Taylor. Allen conducted experiments in several different nuclear test series. These experiments concerned the physics of thermonuclear weapons design and to the effects of high altitude nuclear explosions conceivably to be used for ballistic missile defense.

From June 1957 to December 1961, Allen was assigned to Kirtland Air Force Base, New Mexico, as the science adviser to the Physics Division of the Air Force Special Weapons Center. ("Special weapons" is a euphemism for nuclear and thermonuclear bombs.) Allen specialized in the military effects of high altitude nuclear explosions and participated in several nuclear weapons test series. He was scientific director of a major experiment that utilized a large series of high-altitude rockets to measure the characteristics of electrons trapped in the geomagnetic field after an exoatmospheric nuclear burst.

Allen was assigned in December 1961 to the Office of the Secretary of Defense, Space Technology Office, in the Directorate of Research and Engineering, Washington, D.C. From June 1965 to February 1973, he was assigned to the Office of the Secretary of the Air Force, initially in Los Angeles, California, as the deputy director for advanced plans in the Directorate of Special Projects. Allen next moved to The Pentagon in June 1968 as the deputy director of space systems, and in June 1969, he became the director. He returned to Los Angeles in September 1970 as the assistant to the director of special projects and in April 1971 became the director of special projects, with additional duty as the deputy commander for satellite programs of the Space and Missile Systems Organization.

After serving briefly as the chief of staff for the Air Force Systems Command at Andrews Air Force Base, Maryland, Allen was appointed in March 1973 as a deputy to the Director of Central Intelligence for the Intelligence Community in Washington, D.C. In August 1973, Allen became the director of the National Security Agency (NSA) and the chief of the Central Security Service at Fort George G. Meade, Maryland. Allen's tenure as the NSA director was noteworthy in that he became the first director to ever testify publicly before Congress. In August 1977, he was named commander of Air Force Systems Command.

Allen served as the Vice Chief of Staff of the United States Air Force from April 1978 until he became the Chief of Staff of the Air Force in July 1978. His nomination was unusual in that he had never served in an overseas or combat assignment, and most of his positions were in specialized technical activities, rather than in the usual command structure of the Air Force. Also, he was the last chief of staff with a bomber background; all subsequent chiefs of staff except General Norton Schwartz have been fighter pilots, and this trend is reflected by the Service's weapon budgets, which devote most funding to fighters rather than bombers.

Retirement
Allen did not believe that manned spaceflight was useful. He reportedly told a Manned Spaceflight Engineer that he had helped cancel Manned Orbiting Laboratory in the 1960s, and would have canceled the Space Shuttle program. Following his retirement from the Air Force in 1982, Allen became the director of the Jet Propulsion Laboratory (JPL), during part of the Voyager Program (space probes launched in 1977), and he served as the Director of the JPL until 1990.

Allen was a member of the National Academy of Engineering and the Council on Foreign Relations.

From 1993 to 1995, Allen served as a member of the President's Foreign Intelligence Advisory Board (PFIAB) and the Intelligence Oversight Board.

Allen was awarded the 1999 Distinguished Graduate Award of the Association of Graduates, the alumni association of West Point graduates.

Allen died in Potomac Falls, Virginia, on January 4, 2010, of complications from rheumatoid arthritis.  He was buried at Arlington National Cemetery on March 22, 2010.

Legacy
The United States Air Force created the General Lew Allen, Jr. Trophy in Allen's honor, which is awarded annually to an Officer and a Senior NCO in the aircraft maintenance or munitions career fields directly involved with setting up aircraft sorties.

In 1983, Allen received the Golden Plate Award of the American Academy of Achievement.

Since 1986, the Jet Propulsion Laboratory awards in his honor the Lew Allen Award for Excellence, until 1990 called the Director's Research Achievement Award.

Minor planet 4125 Lew Allen is named in his honor.

Awards and decorations

See also

 Project Shamrock

References

External links
 Official Air Force biography
 JPL mourns passing of former director Lew Allen – JPL/NASA News Service

United States Air Force generals
1925 births
2010 deaths
Directors of the National Security Agency
Recipients of the Legion of Merit
Chiefs of Staff of the United States Air Force
United States Military Academy alumni
Grainger College of Engineering alumni
People from Gainesville, Texas
Deaths from arthritis
Burials at Arlington National Cemetery
Vice Chiefs of Staff of the United States Air Force
Recipients of the Defense Distinguished Service Medal
Recipients of the Air Force Distinguished Service Medal
Recipients of the National Intelligence Distinguished Service Medal
Military personnel from Texas